Salarabad-e Chenar (also Romanized as Sālārābād-e Chenār) is a village in Chenar Rural District, Kabgian District, Dana County, Kohgiluyeh and Boyer-Ahmad Province, Iran. At the 2006 census, its population was 48, in 10 families.

References 

Populated places in Dana County